The Algerian Air Force (AAF) is the aerial arm of the Algerian People's National Army.

History 
The Algerian Air Force was created to support the fight of the People's National Army against the French occupying forces. It came as part of the decisions of the Soummam congress held on August 20, 1956, which recommended a long-term plan to form a modern army.

Before 1962 
In 1957, six Algerians were sent for training to the Syrian Arab Air Force flight school at Nayrab near Aleppo. During this period, training also took place with the Egyptian and Iraqi air forces, as well as in the USSR and in China. During this period, the French army started the Challe and Morice lines used to isolate the ALN fighters inside the country and to stop supplies coming from Tunisia and Morocco. Then came the idea to train transport and helicopter pilots to ensure supplying the national liberation army, and to prepare the first core of the military aviation. The Algerian Air Force was officially established on 4 February 1959, as a part of the FLN.

From 1962 to 1970 
The Algerian Air Force was originally based at Maison Blanche (White House). In 1962, Egypt transferred 12 Helwan Gomhouria trainers and five MiG-15s (two MiG-15UTIs and three MiG-15bis), together with a group of advisors to help with training. Several Mil Mi-4s were also received from the Soviet Union. Two Beech D.185S light transports purchased for the personal use of then President Ben Bella in 1963.

Training was one of the major preoccupations of the ALN/FLN leaders. Military aviation had a core of pilots and technicians after independence, who laid the foundations of the present Air Force. The Algerian authorities sent trainees to friendly countries such Egypt, Syria, Iraq, China, and the USSR, while waiting for the creation of Algerian Air Force schools. In 1966, the Air Base of Tafraoui in the 2nd Military Region was built as an air officers' school (EOA) where the first officer students were received to train as pilots and technicians in aeronautics.

The nascent Algerian Air Force participated in the 1963 Sand War with Morocco. However, air power did not play a big role during the war. MiG-15s and Mi-4s were used, and aircraft from national company Air Algérie served for transport duties. Following the end of the war, the build-up of the Algerian Air Force was intensified. In 1964, 20 additional MiG-15bis fighters were delivered by the USSR. The next year, the first of at least 30 MiG-17s arrived in Algeria. In 1965-1966, 24 MiG-21F-13s were received, and 14 Ilyushin Il-28s were ordered in the same period, as well as some MiG-21FLs. Despite its growth, at the time of the Six-Day War the Algerian Air Force was not deemed combat ready. Still, 20 MiG-17Fs, 20 MiG-21s and 12 Il-28s were sent to Egypt, but without any crews. In 1967, the Algerian Air Force also bought its first surface-to-air missile systems, with two battalions of S-75 Dvinas. However, these were never put into service.

From 1970 to 1980 

In the late 1960s, thanks to increased oil prices and to Algeria's economic growth, important arms orders were passed with the USSR. Hence, in the early 1970s, the Algerian Air Force received 52 MiG-21MFs, MiG-21Rs and MiG-21UMs, and 40 Sukhoi Su-7BMKs. During the same period, 28 second-hand Fouga CM.170 Magisters were bought to West Germany, as well as some Aérospatiale SA 330 Puma and Mil Mi-6 helicopters.

Thanks to its growth in the previous years, the Algerian Air Force was able to participate directly in the 1973 October War. Two squadrons of MiG-21s, another of Su-7s and a unit comprising 23 MiG-17s were sent to Egypt. This deployment was supported by Antonov An-12 transports. Some Algerian pilots were also assigned to Egyptian Air Force MiG-17 squadrons. In total, around 500 combat sorties were flown by Algerian pilots. One MiG-21 and one Su-7 were shot down, but no pilot was killed or captured.

In 1975, another big arms deal was passed with Moscow, including 40 MiG-23BNs, 47 MiG-21bis, and 16 Mil Mi-8s. The first MiG-23BNs arrived in 1976; this type replaced the Su-7BMKs. Another arms order followed in 1978, with the Algerians requesting the delivery of 40 more MiG-21s, 16 MiG-23MFs, 20 Mil Mi-24s, and 12 S-125 Pechora missile systems. However, while 20 MiG-25s were delivered by 1979, negotiations for the remainder of the package proved much more difficult than expected, and took nearly four years. Limited quantities of Western aircraft were bought too: in 1978, six T-34C Mentors and three Fokker F27s were acquired.

From 1980 to 2000 

Through the 1980s, the Algerian Air Force worked to build a fully integrated network of early warning radars. In 1988, this command became a fully independent branch of the Algerian armed forces.

The resulting organisational structure of the air force was as follows:
 A central command assisted by a general staff and an inspectorate, an arms division, a department of support, and specialized offices
 Air commands in the military regions
 Air bases, schools, training centers, support institutions, equipment renovation enterprises & defense, and control units

In the second half of the 1980s, the Algerian Air Force also introduced the wing structure. During this period few changes occurred in the combat aircraft inventory of the Algerian Air Force. Ten Sukhoi Su-24MKs were received from the USSR, while the MiG-17F was phased out. A new airplane supplier emerged just after the Iranian revolution when Algeria received 18 C-130H Hercules and 12 Hawker Beechcrafts supplied by USA from 1981 to 1989.

Starting in the second half of the 1980s, the Algerian Air Force saw combat in the Algerian Civil War.

Since 2000

As the Civil War was winding down, the Algerian Air Force began to replace its older combat aircraft. The last MiG-21s were withdrawn from service in 2002. The MiG-23BNs followed in 2005, as did the MiG-23MFs in 2008. The Air Force purchased a large number of Mikoyan MiG-29s (index 9.13) from Belarus and Ukraine from 1999 to 2003. At least 25 Su-24MKs were also acquired during the same period. In March 2006, as part of a bigger arms deal, Algeria ordered 28 Sukhoi Su-30MKAs, 16 Yakovlev Yak-130s, 28 MiG-29SMTs and six MiG-29UBs to Russia.

Shortly after the first MiG-29SMT deliveries, the Algerian military discovered that these aircraft were not newly built airframes, but older ones modernised to MiG-29SMT standard. The decision was taken to send back the aircraft to Russia, refuse all of the planned subsequent deliveries, and to freeze the payments for these aircraft. After a meeting between Algerian and Russian heads of state in February 2008, the aircraft that had already been delivered were returned to Russia, and the whole batch originally built for Algeria was bought back and delivered to the Russian Air Force. Instead, Algeria was given the possibility to order another batch of Su-30MKAs at sharply reduced prices. This was done in December 2010, when 16 additional aircraft were ordered. In December 2015, 14 more Su-30MKAs were purchased. While the current front-line fleet primarily consists of Russian-origin aircraft such as the Sukhoi Su-30 and the MiG-29, Algeria has expressed an interest in acquiring aircraft from China. Algeria has been seen as a potential operator of the Chinese 4th-Generation JF-17 Thunder fighter project.

Air bases 
 Oum El Bouaghi (DABO)
 Annaba (DABB) 
 Ain Oussera (DAAQ) 
 Biskra (DAUB) 
 Bou Sfer (DAOE) 
 Boufarik (DAAK) 
 Boudghene Ben Ali Lotfi (DAOR) 
 Chlef (DAOI) 
 El Boulaida/Blida (DAAB) 
 Laghouat (DAUL) 
 Tamanrasset/Aguenar (DAAT) 

See also List of airports in Algeria for other airfields which may have a dual civil-military function.

The air force has two regiments of Fusiliers Commandos de l'Air, primarily base defence troops but which have reportedly taken part int anti-terrorism operations. They are the 772nd and 782nd Regiment des Fusiliers Commandos de l'air (RFCA).

Aircraft

Current inventory

Incidents 
On January 27, 2010, a MiG-29 military plane crashed into a mountainous area between Mascara and Sidi Bel Abbès provinces resulting in the pilot’s death.

In November 2012, an Algerian cargo plane(C-295) returning from Paris crashed in southeastern France, killing all six people on board.

In December 2012, two military jets(MiG 29) conducting routine training operations collided in midair in the northwestern Algeria, killing the pilots of both planes.

On February 11, 2014, a C-130 Hercules transport plane crashed in Oum El Bouaghi, Algeria. It resulted in 77 deaths.

On October 11, 2014, an Algerian  SU-24 military plane crashed in a military zone killing its 2 pilots during a training operation inside the country.

On November 11, 2014, an air force MiG-25 'Foxbat' fighter aircraft, came down near a military range in the Hassi Bahbah Military Region in the central part of Algeria. No casualties were reported at the time as the pilot was alone and ejected safely out of the plane.

On April 20, 2015, An Algerian Air Force plane(MiG-25) crashed south of Algeria killing both pilots moments after takeoff.

On March 27, 2016, a troop carrier Mi-171 type helicopter belonging to the Algerian air forces which was on a mission near Reggane crashed due to technical problems south of the country killing 12 soldiers and leaving two others injured.

On April 11, 2018, an Il-76 strategic airlifter crashed in a field shortly after taking off from Boufarik Airport. It resulted in 257 deaths.

On February 2019,an SU-24 crashed in the province of Tiaret. Resulting in 2 deaths.

On March 13,2019,A L-39 crashed at Tafraoui. Resulting in 2 deaths.

On January 28, 2020, a Sukhoi Su-30 fighter jet crashed in the mountains resulting in 2 deaths.

On June 25, 2020, a CH-4 medium-altitude long-endurance UAV crashed due to some unknown issues.

On March 29, 2022, a MIG29UB crashed near the city of Oran, due to a technical malfunction. Resulting in 1 death.

References

Notes

Bibliography

External links 

 
Military of Algeria
Air forces by country
Aviation in Algeria
1962 establishments in Algeria